Clear the Decks is a 1929 American comedy film directed by Joseph Henabery and written by Earle Snell, Gladys Lehman, Albert DeMond and Charles Henry Smith. It is based on the 1926 novel When the Devil Was Sick by E.J. Rath. The film stars Reginald Denny, Olive Hasbrouck, Otis Harlan, Lucien Littlefield, Collette Merton and Robert Anderson. The film was released on March 3, 1929, by Universal Pictures.

Cast        
Reginald Denny as Jack Armitage
Olive Hasbrouck as Miss Bronson
Otis Harlan as Pussyfoot
Lucien Littlefield as Plinge
Collette Merton as Blondie
Robert Anderson as Mate
Elinor Leslie as Aunt
Brooks Benedict as Trumbull

References

External links
 

1929 films
1920s English-language films
American comedy films
1929 comedy films
Universal Pictures films
Films directed by Joseph Henabery
American black-and-white films
1920s American films